Sergiy Dzinziruk (Ukrainian: Сергій Дзиндзирук; born 1 March 1976) is a Ukrainian professional boxer and a former WBO super welterweight champion.

Amateur 
As an amateur he won a silver medal at the 1997 World Amateur Boxing Championships losing in the final to Oleg Saitov. He also won silver in the European Championship in 1998. He won 195 out of 220 fights.

Professional 
His record is 37-1 (23 KOs). He won the WBO world junior middleweight champion title against Daniel Santos (boxer). After that bout, he defended his title six times. He used to fight out of Germany before moving to America and signing with promoters Gary Shaw and Artie Pelullo.

On May 14, 2010 on Showtime Championship Boxing, he faced Daniel Dawson in defense of his WBO World Junior Middleweight Championship. He defeated Dawson by TKO in the 10th round.

Dzinziruk vs Martinez
Dzinziruk moved up in weight to challenge the slick Argentinian boxer Sergio Martínez on March 12, 2011 at the Foxwoods Resort Casino, Mashantucket, Connecticut for the vacant WBC Diamond belt. Martinez dominated the fight, even outjabbing Dzinziruk, and won by TKO in round 8 after knocking his opponent down 5 times in the fight. Prior to his fight with Martinez, Dzinziruk had never been knocked down in his professional and amateur careers.

On the 5th Of October 2011, the WBO stripped Dzinziruk of the junior middleweight title due to inactivity, with his last title defence being his on May 14, 2010 against Daniel Dawson. This was because Dzinziruk had been battling with a number of injuries, and after pulling out of his scheduled September 30 defence against Lukas Konecny, the interim WBO junior middleweight champion Zaurbek Baysangurov was promoted to the status of "full champion."

Professional boxing record

See also
List of world light-middleweight boxing champions

References

External links

News and Pictures of Sergiy Dzinziruk

 

|-

1976 births
Living people
Ukrainian male boxers
People from Nyzhnohirskyi Raion
Boxers at the 1996 Summer Olympics
Olympic boxers of Ukraine
Southpaw boxers
AIBA World Boxing Championships medalists
Light-middleweight boxers
Middleweight boxers
World light-middleweight boxing champions
European Boxing Union champions
World Boxing Organization champions